The 1997 Madrid summit was a NATO summit held in Madrid, Spain from 8–9 July 1997. It was the 15th NATO summit and the second in 1997, the previous one being held in Paris. The summit was notable for inviting three new members, Hungary, Poland, and the Czech Republic to join the alliance.

Participants
The official meetings were led by NATO Secretary General Javier Solana. One notable absence from the summit was Boris Yeltsin, President of Russia, which was instead represented by lower level bureaucrats,

In attendance

Topics
The topic of enlargement was the main focus of the summit. The result of the summit was that Hungary, Poland, and the Czech Republic were invited to join NATO. Fellow Visegrád Group member Slovakia was excluded from this invitation. Slovakia had held a referendum on NATO membership in May 1997, but turnout in the referendum failed to achieve the required 50% of eligible voters and government sabotage was blamed, which in turn was viewed as one of a string of undemocratic measures taken by Prime Minister Vladimír Mečiar. A majority of NATO members reportedly supported France's proposal to also immediately invite Romania and Slovenia as members, but this was strongly opposed by U.S. President Bill Clinton, and even a "iron-clad guarantee" that they could be invited in two years time was watered-down in favor of an "open door" policy for new potential members. A main concern for the United States was the cost of potentially raising the military standards of the new Eastern European members. Estimates put this cost at as much as US$10 billion, which participants worried could lead to the treaty recognizing the new members being rejected by the Republican-held U.S. Senate. Additionally, a "Charter on a Distinctive Partnership" was signed between NATO and Ukraine, creating the NATO-Ukraine Commission and establishing relations between the two, and a declaration supporting peace efforts in Bosnia-Herzegovina was read and signed by participants.

References

External links
Official site

1997 Madrid summit
1997 in politics
Diplomatic conferences in Spain
20th-century diplomatic conferences
1997 in international relations
1997 conferences
Spain and NATO
July 1997 events in Europe